Chuguyevka is a military air base of the Russian Air Force in Primorsky Krai, Russia.

Chuguyevka Air Base's was built by the Soviet Union with the primary objective of scrambling aircraft against Lockheed SR-71 Blackbird flights over Vladivostok. The primary operator of the base was the 530th Fighter Aviation Regiment (530 IAP) of the 11th Independent Air Defence Army (11 OA PVO) of the Soviet Air Defence Forces. The base was also written in various references as Chuguevka, Sandagou, Sikharovka (erroneous), Sakharovka (erroneous), Sokolovka, and Bulyga-Fadeyevo. During the 1960s, Chuguyevka housed Mikoyan-Gurevich MiG-17 (NATO: Fresco) aircraft, and by 1972 a CIA analysis listed 43 MiG-17 Fresco interceptors and 10 Mikoyan-Gurevich MiG-15UTI [[NATO: Midget) trainers operating at this airfield.  By the 1970s as SR-71 flights became an issue of concern, the base was assigned 36 new Mikoyan-Gurevich MiG-25P (NATO: Foxbat) planes.

In September 1976, Chuguyevka Air Base rose to prominence when Viktor Belenko, a MiG-25 pilot stationed at the base, defected to the United States by flying to Hakodate, Japan. This incident was a major security breach for the Soviet Union, and one of the most publicized defections of the Cold War.

Since the 1990s, following the dissolution of the Soviet Union, Chuguyevka Air Base has been operated by the Russian Air Force, and MiG-25s were phased out as the primary aircraft and replaced with Mikoyan-Gurevich MiG-31s.

References

RussianAirFields.com

Russian Air Force bases
Soviet Air Force bases
Soviet Air Defence Force bases